Kemaman is a federal constituency in Kemaman District, Terengganu, Malaysia, that has been represented in the Dewan Rakyat since 1959.

The federal constituency was created in the 1958 redistribution and is mandated to return a single member to the Dewan Rakyat under the first past the post voting system.

Demographics 
https://live.chinapress.com.my/ge15/parliament/TERENGGANU

History

Polling districts 
According to the federal gazette issued on 31 October 2022, the Kemaman constituency is divided into 48 polling districts.

Representation history

State constituency

Current state assembly members

Local governments

Election results

References

Terengganu federal constituencies